Stigmella phyllanthina is a moth of the family Nepticulidae. It is only known from the south-eastern coast of New South Wales, Australia.

The wingspan is 3.8-4.6 mm for males.

The larvae feed on Glochidion ferdinandi. They mine the leaves of their host plant. The mine consists of a long broad sinuate gallery. The cocoon is white.

External links
Australian Faunal Directory
Australian Nepticulidae (Lepidoptera): Redescription of the named species

Nepticulidae
Moths of Australia
Moths described in 1906